The Gatorade Player of the Year awards are given annually to up and coming high school student-athletes in the United States. They are given for boys baseball, boys and girls basketball, boys and girls cross country, boys football, boys and girls soccer, boys and girls track & field, girls softball, and girls volleyball.

A "State Player of the Year" award is given to the best student-athlete in each of the twelve sports in the District of Columbia and each of the fifty states, where each sport is recognized as an interscholastic sport. Selection is based on three criteria: athletic achievement, academic excellence, and exemplary character (including sportsmanship, and participation in community and other activities). Twelve "National Player of the Year" awards are then given, to the best student-athlete in each of the twelve sports, chosen from the state winners in the respective sport.

Finally, one male Athlete of the Year and one female Athlete of the Year are selected from the twelve National Player of the Year recipients. The two winners are voted on by a national panel with about 400 sports journalists, coaches, and others. The two athletes of the year receive their awards at a special ceremony prior to The ESPY Awards in Los Angeles.

The Gatorade Company established the awards in 1986. The selection process was administered by ESPN RISE which was ESPN's division for high-school sports. The selection process is currently run by the Gatorade Player of the Year Selection Committee.

Past national winners include Peyton Manning and Emmitt Smith for football, LeBron James and Kobe Bryant for basketball, Allyson Felix for track and field, and Kerri Walsh for volleyball.

Athletes of the Year

Awards include:

National Sports Winners
Awards include:

Baseball

Basketball

Cross Country

Football

Soccer

Softball

Track and Field

Volleyball

State winners
See

See also
Wendy's High School Heisman (student-athletes in various sports)
National High School Hall of Fame
Naismith Prep Player of the Year Award
Mr. Basketball USA
 List of U.S. high school basketball national player of the year awards
 List of sports awards honoring women

Notes

References

External links
 

Gatorade
Most valuable player awards
Student athlete awards in the United States
American sports trophies and awards
Sport of athletics awards
Baseball trophies and awards in the United States
American basketball trophies and awards
Softball trophies and awards in the United States
American soccer trophies and awards
Volleyball awards
High school football trophies and awards in the United States
High school baseball in the United States
High school basketball in the United States
High school softball in the United States
High school volleyball in the United States
High school sports in the United States
Cross country running in the United States
Youth soccer in the United States
Track and field in the United States
Awards established in 1985
1985 establishments in the United States
Sports awards honoring women
Awards honoring children or youth